The schools listed below are members of the Indiana High School Athletic Association and are not members of a conference. Of these, several were at one time members of a conference but became independent because of budget and travel concerns. However, some of them, mostly private schools, are also independent in order to better prepare for the state tournament, a practice that the IHSAA has begun to crack down on in recent years.

Indiana's Class System
Indiana's classes are determined by skill level, broken into categories of roughly equal skill depending on the sport. The 2011-12 school year marks a change in the classification period, as schools are reclassified in all class sports biennially instead of quadrennially.

It is also important to note that some schools (mostly private) are placed in classes higher than their enrollment. This is due to a new IHSAA rule that took effect for the 2012-13 year that dictates that a school that has made two appearances at the state championships in a row, win or lose, is automatically moved up into the next class.
These 58 Schools are independent members of the IHSAA.

Defunct Independent Schools
These are schools that were independent at the time of their closing.
This list is incomplete.

Independent Football Members
These schools are independent in football, but play other sports within a conference.

References

Resources
Conference Alignments
IHSAA 2009-10 Roster

 
Indiana high school athletic conferences